Medaniaria is a monotypic snout moth genus described by Rolf-Ulrich Roesler and Peter Victor Küppers in 1979. Its one species, Medaniaria adiacritis, described by Alfred Jefferis Turner in 1904, is known from Australia, including Queensland.

References

Moths described in 1904
Phycitini
Monotypic moth genera
Moths of Australia
Pyralidae genera